The Rochester Mayoral Election of 2017 was an election to determine who will hold the office of Mayor of Rochester, New York in the upcoming term. The election took place on November 7, 2017. Incumbent mayor Lovely Warren was elected to a second term in office.

Primaries
The Democratic Primary took place on September 12, 2017. Incumbent mayor Lovely A. Warren defeated former police chief and current county legislator James Sheppard as well as former journalist Rachel Barnhart, and though Sheppard had secured the nomination of the Independence Party of New York and the Working Families Party, he stated that his campaign "was finished" following the primary.

Declared Candidates
As of April, six candidates declared their intent to run:

Democratic Party
Lovely A. Warren, incumbent Mayor of Rochester.
James M. Sheppard, former Chief of the Rochester Police Department and current member of the Monroe County Legislature representing the 23rd district.
Rachel Barnhart, former State Assembly candidate and broadcast journalist for WHAM-TV and WROC.
Alex White, local business owner and former Green Party candidate for mayor.

Republican Party
Tony Micciche, current member of the Monroe County Legislature representing the 26th district.

Green Party
Alex White

Independent
Lori Thomas, retired teacher.

General Election

Notes

James Sheppard ended his campaign after losing the Democratic primary, but was still on the ballot on the Independence Party and Working Families Party lines
Alex White sought the nomination of both the Green Party and the Democratic Party, but ran on the Green Party line

References

External links
Mayoral Debate hosted by WROC-TV held on October 23, 2017

2017 New York (state) elections
Mayoral elections in Rochester, New York
Rochester
2017 in New York (state)